Postmodernism is an intellectual stance or mode of discourse characterized by skepticism toward the "grand narratives" of modernism, rejection of epistemic certainty or the stability of meaning, and sensitivity to the role of ideology in maintaining political power. Claims to objectivity are dismissed as naïve realism, with attention drawn to the conditional nature of knowledge claims within particular historical, political, and cultural discourses. The postmodern outlook is characterized by self-referentiality, epistemological relativism, moral relativism, pluralism, irony, irreverence, and eclecticism; it rejects the "universal validity" of binary oppositions, stable identity, hierarchy, and categorization.

Initially emerging from a mode of literary criticism, postmodernism developed in the mid-twentieth century as a rejection of modernism, and has been observed across many disciplines. Postmodernism is associated with the disciplines deconstruction and post-structuralism. Various authors have criticized postmodernism as promoting obscurantism, as abandoning Enlightenment rationalism and scientific rigor, and as adding nothing to analytical or empirical knowledge.

Definition 
Postmodernism is an intellectual stance or mode of discourse which challenges worldviews associated with Enlightenment rationality dating back to the 17th century. Postmodernism is associated with relativism and a focus on the role of ideology in the maintenance of economic and political power. Postmodernists are "skeptical of explanations which claim to be valid for all groups, cultures, traditions, or races, and instead focuses on the relative truths of each person". It considers "reality" to be a mental construct. Postmodernism rejects the possibility of unmediated reality or objectively-rational knowledge, asserting that all interpretations are contingent on the perspective from which they are made; claims to objective fact are dismissed as naive realism.

Postmodern thinkers frequently describe knowledge claims and value systems as contingent or socially-conditioned, describing them as products of political, historical, or cultural discourses and hierarchies. Accordingly, postmodern thought is broadly characterized by tendencies to self-referentiality, epistemological and moral relativism, pluralism, and irreverence. Postmodernism is often associated with schools of thought such as deconstruction and post-structuralism. Postmodernism relies on critical theory, which considers the effects of ideology, society, and history on culture. Postmodernism and critical theory commonly criticize universalist ideas of objective reality, morality, truth, human nature, reason, language, and social progress.

Initially, postmodernism was a mode of discourse on literature and literary criticism, commenting on the nature of literary text, meaning, author and reader, writing, and reading. Postmodernism developed in the mid- to late-twentieth century across many scholarly disciplines as a departure or rejection of modernism.  As a critical practice, postmodernism employs concepts such as hyperreality, simulacrum, trace, and difference, and rejects abstract principles in favor of direct experience.

Origins of term
The term postmodern was first used in 1870. John Watkins Chapman suggested "a Postmodern style of painting" as a way to depart from French Impressionism. J. M. Thompson, in his 1914 article in The Hibbert Journal (a quarterly philosophical review), used it to describe changes in attitudes and beliefs in the critique of religion, writing: "The raison d'être of Post-Modernism is to escape from the double-mindedness of Modernism by being thorough in its criticism by extending it to religion as well as theology, to Catholic feeling as well as to Catholic tradition."

In 1942 H. R. Hays described postmodernism as a new literary form.

In 1926, Bernard Iddings Bell, president of St. Stephen's College (now Bard College), published Postmodernism and Other Essays, marking the first use of the term to describe the historical period following Modernity. The essay criticizes the lingering socio-cultural norms, attitudes, and practices of the Age of Enlightenment. It also forecasts the major cultural shifts toward Postmodernity and (Bell being an Anglican Episcopal priest) suggests orthodox religion as a solution. However, the term postmodernity was first used as a general theory for a historical movement in 1939 by Arnold J. Toynbee: "Our own Post-Modern Age has been inaugurated by the general war of 1914–1918".

In 1949 the term was used to describe a dissatisfaction with modern architecture and led to the postmodern architecture movement in response to the modernist architectural movement known as the International Style. Postmodernism in architecture was initially marked by a re-emergence of surface ornament, reference to surrounding buildings in urban settings, historical reference in decorative forms (eclecticism), and non-orthogonal angles.

Author Peter Drucker suggested the transformation into a post-modern world that happened between 1937 and 1957 and described it as a "nameless era" characterized as a shift to a conceptual world based on pattern, purpose, and process rather than a mechanical cause. This shift was outlined by four new realities: the emergence of an Educated Society, the importance of international development, the decline of the nation-state, and the collapse of the viability of non-Western cultures.

In 1971, in a lecture delivered at the Institute of Contemporary Art, London, Mel Bochner described "post-modernism" in art as having started with Jasper Johns, "who first rejected sense-data and the singular point-of-view as the basis for his art, and treated art as a critical investigation".

In 1996, Walter Truett Anderson described postmodernism as belonging to one of four typological world views which he identified as:

 Neo-romantic, in which truth is found through attaining harmony with nature or spiritual exploration of the inner self.
 Postmodern-ironist, which sees truth as socially constructed.
 Scientific-rational, in which truth is defined through methodical, disciplined inquiry.
 Social-traditional, in which truth is found in the heritage of American and Western civilization.

History
The basic features of what is now called postmodernism can be found as early as the 1940s, most notably in the work of artists such as Jorge Luis Borges. However, most scholars today agree postmodernism began to compete with modernism in the late 1950s and gained ascendancy over it in the 1960s.

The primary features of postmodernism typically include the ironic play with styles, citations, and narrative levels, a metaphysical skepticism or nihilism towards a "grand narrative" of Western culture, and a preference for the virtual at the expense of the Real (or more accurately, a fundamental questioning of what 'the real' constitutes).

Since the late 1990s, there has been a growing sentiment in popular culture and in academia that postmodernism "has gone out of fashion". Others argue that postmodernism is dead in the context of current cultural production.

Theories and derivatives

Structuralism and post-structuralism 
Structuralism was a philosophical movement developed by French academics in the 1950s, partly in response to French existentialism, and often interpreted in relation to modernism and high modernism. Thinkers who have been called "structuralists" include the anthropologist Claude Lévi-Strauss, the linguist Ferdinand de Saussure, the Marxist philosopher Louis Althusser, and the semiotician Algirdas Greimas. The early writings of the psychoanalyst Jacques Lacan and the literary theorist Roland Barthes have also been called "structuralist". Those who began as structuralists but became post-structuralists include Michel Foucault, Roland Barthes, Jean Baudrillard, and Gilles Deleuze. Other post-structuralists include Jacques Derrida, Pierre Bourdieu, Jean-François Lyotard, Julia Kristeva, Hélène Cixous, and Luce Irigaray. The American cultural theorists, critics, and intellectuals whom they influenced include Judith Butler, John Fiske, Rosalind Krauss, Avital Ronell, and Hayden White.

Like structuralists, post-structuralists start from the assumption that people's identities, values, and economic conditions determine each other rather than having intrinsic properties that can be understood in isolation. Thus the French structuralists considered themselves to be espousing relativism and constructionism. But they nevertheless tended to explore how the subjects of their study might be described, reductively, as a set of essential relationships, schematics, or mathematical symbols. (An example is Claude Lévi-Strauss's algebraic formulation of mythological transformation in "The Structural Study of Myth").

Postmodernism entails reconsideration of the entire Western value system (love, marriage, popular culture, shift from an industrial to a service economy) that took place since the 1950s and 1960s, with a peak in the Social Revolution of 1968—are described with the term postmodernity, as opposed to postmodernism, a term referring to an opinion or movement. Post-structuralism is characterized by new ways of thinking through structuralism, contrary to the original form.

Deconstruction

One of the most well-known postmodernist concerns is deconstruction, a theory for philosophy, literary criticism, and textual analysis developed by Jacques Derrida. Critics have insisted that Derrida's work is rooted in a statement found in Of Grammatology: "" ('there is nothing outside the text'). Such critics misinterpret the statement as denying any reality outside of books. The statement is actually part of a critique of "inside" and "outside" metaphors when referring to the text, and is a corollary to the observation that there is no "inside" of a text as well. This attention to a text's unacknowledged reliance on metaphors and figures embedded within its discourse is characteristic of Derrida's approach. Derrida's method sometimes involves demonstrating that a given philosophical discourse depends on binary oppositions or excluding terms that the discourse itself has declared to be irrelevant or inapplicable. Derrida's philosophy inspired a postmodern movement called deconstructivism among architects, characterized by a design that rejects structural "centers" and encourages decentralized play among its elements. Derrida discontinued his involvement with the movement after the publication of his collaborative project with architect Peter Eisenman in Chora L Works: Jacques Derrida and Peter Eisenman.

Post-postmodernism
The connection between postmodernism, posthumanism, and cyborgism has led to a challenge to postmodernism, for which the terms Post-postmodernism and postpoststructuralism were first coined in 2003:
 

More recently metamodernism, post-postmodernism and the "death of postmodernism" have been widely debated: in 2007 Andrew Hoberek noted in his introduction to a special issue of the journal Twentieth-Century Literature titled "After Postmodernism" that "declarations of postmodernism's demise have become a critical commonplace". A small group of critics has put forth a range of theories that aim to describe culture or society in the alleged aftermath of postmodernism, most notably Raoul Eshelman (performatism), Gilles Lipovetsky (hypermodernity), Nicolas Bourriaud (altermodern), and Alan Kirby (digimodernism, formerly called pseudo-modernism). None of these new theories or labels have so far gained very widespread acceptance. Sociocultural anthropologist Nina Müller-Schwarze offers neostructuralism as a possible direction. The exhibition Postmodernism – Style and Subversion 1970–1990 at the Victoria and Albert Museum (London, 24 September 2011 – 15 January 2012) was billed as the first show to document postmodernism as a historical movement.

Philosophy

In the 1970s a group of poststructuralists in France developed a radical critique of modern philosophy with roots discernible in Nietzsche, Kierkegaard, and Heidegger, and became known as postmodern theorists, notably including Jacques Derrida, Michel Foucault, Jean-François Lyotard, Jean Baudrillard, and others. New and challenging modes of thought and writing pushed the development of new areas and topics in philosophy. By the 1980s, this spread to America (Richard Rorty) and the world.

Jacques Derrida

Jacques Derrida was a French-Algerian philosopher best known for developing a form of semiotic analysis known as deconstruction, which he discussed in numerous texts, and developed in the context of phenomenology. He is one of the major figures associated with post-structuralism and postmodern philosophy.

Derrida re-examined the fundamentals of writing and its consequences on philosophy in general; sought to undermine the language of "presence" or metaphysics in an analytical technique which, beginning as a point of departure from Heidegger's notion of Destruktion, came to be known as deconstruction.

Michel Foucault

Michel Foucault was a French philosopher, historian of ideas, social theorist, and literary critic. First associated with structuralism, Foucault created an oeuvre that today is seen as belonging to post-structuralism and to postmodern philosophy. The Times Higher Education Guide described him in 2009 as the most cited author in the humanities.

Michel Foucault introduced concepts such as discursive regime, or re-invoked those of older philosophers like episteme and genealogy in order to explain the relationship between meaning, power, and social behavior within social orders (see The Order of Things, The Archaeology of Knowledge, Discipline and Punish, and The History of Sexuality).

Jean-François Lyotard

Influenced by Nietzsche, Jean-François Lyotard is credited with being the first to use the term in a philosophical context, in his 1979 work . In it, he follows Wittgenstein's language games model and speech act theory, contrasting two different language games, that of the expert, and that of the philosopher.  He talks about the transformation of knowledge into information in the computer age and likens the transmission or reception of coded messages (information) to a position within a language game.

Lyotard defined philosophical postmodernism in The Postmodern Condition, writing: "Simplifying to the extreme, I define postmodern as incredulity towards metanarratives...." where what he means by metanarrative (in French, grands récits) is something like a unified, complete, universal, and epistemically certain story about everything that is. Postmodernists reject metanarratives because they reject the concept of truth that metanarratives presuppose. Postmodernist philosophers, in general, argue that truth is always contingent on historical and social context rather than being absolute and universal—and that truth is always partial and "at issue" rather than being complete and certain.

Richard Rorty

Richard Rorty argues in Philosophy and the Mirror of Nature that contemporary analytic philosophy mistakenly imitates scientific methods. In addition, he denounces the traditional epistemological perspectives of representationalism and correspondence theory that rely upon the independence of knowers and observers from phenomena and the passivity of natural phenomena in relation to consciousness.

Jean Baudrillard

Jean Baudrillard, in Simulacra and Simulation, introduced the concept that reality or the principle of the Real is short-circuited by the interchangeability of signs in an era whose communicative and semantic acts are dominated by electronic media and digital technologies. For Baudrillard, "simulation is no longer that of a territory, a referential being or a substance. It is the generation by models of a real without origin or reality: a hyperreal."

Fredric Jameson

Fredric Jameson set forth one of the first expansive theoretical treatments of postmodernism as a historical period, intellectual trend, and social phenomenon in a series of lectures at the Whitney Museum, later expanded as Postmodernism, or, the Cultural Logic of Late Capitalism (1991).

Douglas Kellner

In Analysis of the Journey, a journal birthed from postmodernism, Douglas Kellner insists that the "assumptions and procedures of modern theory" must be forgotten. Extensively, Kellner analyzes the terms of this theory in real-life experiences and examples. Kellner used science and technology studies as a major part of his analysis; he urged that the theory is incomplete without it. The scale was larger than just postmodernism alone; it must be interpreted through cultural studies where science and technology studies play a huge role. The reality of the September 11 attacks on the United States of America is the catalyst for his explanation. In response, Kellner continues to examine the repercussions of understanding the effects of the 11 September attacks. He questions if the attacks are only able to be understood in a limited form of postmodern theory due to the level of irony.

The conclusion he depicts is simple: postmodernism, as most use it today, will decide what experiences and signs in one's reality will be one's reality as they know it.

Manifestations

Architecture

Modern Architecture, as established and developed by Walter Gropius and Le Corbusier, was focused on:
 the attempted harmony of form and function; and,
 the dismissal of "frivolous ornament."
 the pursuit of a perceived ideal perfection;
They argued for architecture that represented the spirit of the age as depicted in cutting-edge technology, be it airplanes, cars, ocean liners, or even supposedly artless grain silos. 
Modernist Ludwig Mies van der Rohe is associated with the phrase "less is more".

Critics of Modernism have:
 argued that the attributes of perfection and minimalism are themselves subjective;
 pointed out anachronisms in modern thought; and,
 questioned the benefits of its philosophy.

The intellectual scholarship regarding postmodernism and architecture is closely linked with the writings of critic-turned-architect Charles Jencks, beginning with lectures in the early 1970s and his essay "The Rise of Post Modern Architecture" from 1975. His magnum opus, however, is the book The Language of Post-Modern Architecture, first published in 1977, and since running to seven editions. Jencks makes the point that Post-Modernism (like Modernism) varies for each field of art, and that for architecture it is not just a reaction to Modernism but what he terms double coding: "Double Coding: the combination of Modern techniques with something else (usually traditional building) in order for architecture to communicate with the public and a concerned minority, usually other architects." In their book, "Revisiting Postmodernism", Terry Farrell and Adam Furman argue that postmodernism brought a more joyous and sensual experience to the culture, particularly in architecture.

Art

Postmodern art is a body of art movements that sought to contradict some aspects of modernism or some aspects that emerged or developed in its aftermath. Cultural production manifesting as intermedia, installation art, conceptual art, deconstructionist display, and multimedia, particularly involving video, are described as postmodern.

Graphic design

Early mention of postmodernism as an element of graphic design appeared in the British magazine, "Design". A characteristic of postmodern graphic design is that "retro, techno, punk, grunge, beach, parody, and pastiche were all conspicuous trends. Each had its own sites and venues, detractors and advocates."

Literature

Jorge Luis Borges' (1939) short story "Pierre Menard, Author of the Quixote", is often considered as predicting postmodernism and is a paragon of the ultimate parody. Samuel Beckett is also considered an important precursor and influence. Novelists who are commonly connected with postmodern literature include Vladimir Nabokov, William Gaddis, Umberto Eco, Italo Calvino, Pier Vittorio Tondelli, John Hawkes, William S. Burroughs, Kurt Vonnegut, John Barth, Robert Coover, Jean Rhys, Donald Barthelme, E. L. Doctorow, Richard Kalich, Jerzy Kosiński, Don DeLillo, Thomas Pynchon (Pynchon's work has also been described as high modern), Ishmael Reed, Kathy Acker, Ana Lydia Vega, Jáchym Topol and Paul Auster.

In 1971, the American scholar Ihab Hassan published The Dismemberment of Orpheus: Toward a Postmodern Literature, an early work of literary criticism from a postmodern perspective that traces the development of what he calls "literature of silence" through Marquis de Sade, Franz Kafka, Ernest Hemingway, Samuel Beckett, and many others, including developments such as the Theatre of the Absurd and the nouveau roman.

In Postmodernist Fiction (1987), Brian McHale details the shift from modernism to postmodernism, arguing that the former is characterized by an epistemological dominant and that postmodern works have developed out of modernism and are primarily concerned with questions of ontology. McHale's second book, Constructing Postmodernism (1992), provides readings of postmodern fiction and some contemporary writers who go under the label of cyberpunk. McHale's "What Was Postmodernism?" (2007) follows Raymond Federman's lead in now using the past tense when discussing postmodernism.

Music

Jonathan Kramer has written that avant-garde musical compositions (which some would consider modernist rather than postmodernist) "defy more than seduce the listener, and they extend by potentially unsettling means the very idea of what music is." In the 1960s, composers such as Terry Riley, Henryk Górecki, Bradley Joseph, John Adams, Steve Reich, Philip Glass, Michael Nyman, and Lou Harrison reacted to the perceived elitism and dissonant sound of atonal academic modernism by producing music with simple textures and relatively consonant harmonies, whilst others, most notably John Cage challenged the prevailing narratives of beauty and objectivity common to Modernism.

Author on postmodernism, Dominic Strinati, has noted, it is also important "to include in this category the so-called 'art rock' musical innovations and mixing of styles associated with groups like Talking Heads, and performers like Laurie Anderson, together with the self-conscious 'reinvention of disco' by the Pet Shop Boys".

In the late-20th century, avant-garde academics labelled American singer Madonna, as the "personification of the postmodern", with Christian writer Graham Cray saying that "Madonna is perhaps the most visible example of what is called post-modernism", and Martin Amis described her as "perhaps the most postmodern personage on the planet". She was also suggested by assistant professor Olivier Sécardin of Utrecht University to epitomise postmodernism.

Urban planning
Modernism sought to design and plan cities that followed the logic of the new model of industrial mass production; reverting to large-scale solutions, aesthetic standardisation, and prefabricated design solutions. Modernism eroded urban living by its failure to recognise differences and aim towards homogeneous landscapes (Simonsen 1990, 57). Jane Jacobs' 1961 book The Death and Life of Great American Cities was a sustained critique of urban planning as it had developed within Modernism and marked a transition from modernity to postmodernity in thinking about urban planning (Irving 1993, 479).

The transition from Modernism to Postmodernism is often said to have happened at 3:32 pm on 15 July in 1972, when Pruitt–Igoe, a housing development for low-income people in St. Louis designed by architect Minoru Yamasaki, which had been a prize-winning version of Le Corbusier's 'machine for modern living,' was deemed uninhabitable and was torn down (Irving 1993, 480). Since then, Postmodernism has involved theories that embrace and aim to create diversity. It exalts uncertainty, flexibility and change (Hatuka & D'Hooghe 2007) and rejects utopianism while embracing a utopian way of thinking and acting. Postmodernity of 'resistance' seeks to deconstruct Modernism and is a critique of the origins without necessarily returning to them (Irving 1993, 60). As a result of Postmodernism, planners are much less inclined to lay a firm or steady claim to there being one single 'right way' of engaging in urban planning and are more open to different styles and ideas of 'how to plan' (Irving 474).

The postmodern approach to understanding the city were pioneered in the 1980s by what could be called the "Los Angeles School of Urbanism" centered on the UCLA's Urban Planning Department in the 1980s, where contemporary Los Angeles was taken to be the postmodern city par excellence, contra posed to what had been the dominant ideas of the Chicago School formed in the 1920s at the University of Chicago, with its framework of urban ecology and emphasis on functional areas of use within a city, and the concentric circles to understand the sorting of different population groups. Edward Soja of the Los Angeles School combined Marxist and postmodern perspectives and focused on the economic and social changes (globalization, specialization, industrialization/deindustrialization, Neo-Liberalism, mass migration) that lead to the creation of large city-regions with their patchwork of population groups and economic uses.

Criticisms

Criticisms of postmodernism are intellectually diverse, including the argument that postmodernism is meaningless and promotes obscurantism.

In part in reference to post-modernism, conservative English philosopher Roger Scruton wrote, "A writer who says that there are no truths, or that all truth is 'merely relative,' is asking you not to believe him. So don't." Similarly, Dick Hebdige criticized the vagueness of the term, enumerating a long list of otherwise unrelated concepts that people have designated as postmodernism, from "the décor of a room" or "a 'scratch' video", to fear of nuclear armageddon and the "implosion of meaning", and stated that anything that could signify all of those things was "a buzzword".

The linguist and philosopher Noam Chomsky has said that postmodernism is meaningless because it adds nothing to analytical or empirical knowledge. He asks why postmodernist intellectuals do not respond like people in other fields when asked, "what are the principles of their theories, on what evidence are they based, what do they explain that wasn't already obvious, etc.?...If [these requests] can't be met, then I'd suggest recourse to Hume's advice in similar circumstances: 'to the flames'."

Christian philosopher William Lane Craig has said "The idea that we live in a postmodern culture is a myth. In fact, a postmodern culture is an impossibility; it would be utterly unliveable. People are not relativistic when it comes to matters of science, engineering, and technology; rather, they are relativistic and pluralistic in matters of religion and ethics. But, of course, that's not postmodernism; that's modernism!"

American author Thomas Pynchon targeted postmodernism as an object of derision in his novels, openly mocking postmodernist discourse.

American academic and aesthete Camille Paglia has said:

German philosopher Albrecht Wellmer has said that "postmodernism at its best might be seen as a self-critical – a sceptical, ironic, but nevertheless unrelenting – form of modernism; a modernism beyond utopianism, scientism and foundationalism; in short a post-metaphysical modernism."

A formal, academic critique of postmodernism can be found in Beyond the Hoax by physics professor Alan Sokal and in Fashionable Nonsense by Sokal and Belgian physicist Jean Bricmont, both books discussing the so-called Sokal affair. In 1996, Sokal wrote a deliberately nonsensical article in a style similar to postmodernist articles, which was accepted for publication by the postmodern cultural studies journal, Social Text. On the same day of the release he published another article in a different journal explaining the Social Text article hoax. The philosopher Thomas Nagel has supported Sokal and Bricmont, describing their book Fashionable Nonsense as consisting largely of "extensive quotations of scientific gibberish from name-brand French intellectuals, together with eerily patient explanations of why it is gibberish," and agreeing that "there does seem to be something about the Parisian scene that is particularly hospitable to reckless verbosity."

Zimbabwean-born British Marxist Alex Callinicos says that postmodernism "reflects the disappointed revolutionary generation of '68, and the incorporation of many of its members into the professional and managerial 'new middle class'. It is best read as a symptom of political frustration and social mobility rather than as a significant intellectual or cultural phenomenon in its own right."

Analytic philosopher Daniel Dennett said, "Postmodernism, the school of 'thought' that proclaimed 'There are no truths, only interpretations' has largely played itself out in absurdity, but it has left behind a generation of academics in the humanities disabled by their distrust of the very idea of truth and their disrespect for evidence, settling for 'conversations' in which nobody is wrong and nothing can be confirmed, only asserted with whatever style you can muster."

American historian Richard Wolin traces the origins of postmodernism to intellectual roots in fascism, writing "postmodernism has been nourished by the doctrines of Friedrich Nietzsche, Martin Heidegger, Maurice Blanchot, and Paul de Man—all of whom either prefigured or succumbed to the proverbial intellectual fascination with fascism."

Daniel A. Farber and Suzanna Sherry criticised postmodernism for reducing the complexity of the modern world to an expression of power and for undermining truth and reason:

Richard Caputo, William Epstein, David Stoesz & Bruce Thyer consider postmodernism to be a "dead-end in social work epistemology." They write:

H. Sidky pointed out what he sees as several inherent flaws of a postmodern antiscience perspective, including the confusion of the authority of science (evidence) with the scientist conveying the knowledge; its self-contradictory claim that all truths are relative; and its strategic ambiguity. He sees 21st-century anti-scientific and pseudo-scientific approaches to knowledge, particularly in the United States, as rooted in a postmodernist "decades-long academic assault on science:"

Criticism by "postmodernists" themselves 
The French psychotherapist and philosopher, Félix Guattari, rejected its theoretical assumptions by arguing that the structuralist and postmodernist visions of the world were not flexible enough to seek explanations in psychological, social, and environmental domains at the same time.

In an interview with Truls Lie, Jean Baudrillard noted: "[ Transmodernism, etc.] are better terms than “postmodernism”. It is not about modernity; it is about every system that has developed its mode of expression to the extent that it surpasses itself and its own logic. This is what I am trying to analyze." "There is no longer any ontologically secret substance. I perceive this to be nihilism rather than postmodernism."

See also

Theory
 
 
 
Culture and politics
 
 
 

Philosophy
 
 
Religion
 
History
 
Opposed by

References

Further reading

 
 Alexie, Sherman (2000). "The Toughest Indian in the World"
 Anderson, Perry. The origins of postmodernity. London: Verso, 1998.
 Anderson, Walter Truett. The Truth about the Truth (New Consciousness Reader). New York: Tarcher. (1995)
 Arena, Leonardo Vittorio (2015) On Nudity. An Introduction to Nonsense, Mimesis International.
 Ashley, Richard and Walker, R. B. J. (1990) "Speaking the Language of Exile." International Studies Quarterly v 34, no 3 259–68.
 Bauman, Zygmunt (2000) Liquid Modernity. Cambridge: Polity Press.
 Beck, Ulrich (1986) Risk Society: Towards a New Modernity.
 Benhabib, Seyla (1995) "Feminism and Postmodernism" in (ed. Nicholson) Feminism Contentions: A Philosophical Exchange. New York: Routledge.
 Berman, Marshall (1982) All That Is Solid Melts into Air: The Experience of Modernity.
 Bertens, Hans (1995) The Idea of the Postmodern: A History. London: Routledge..
 Best, Steven and Douglas Kellner. Postmodern Theory  (1991) excerpt and text search
 Best, Steven, and Douglas Kellner. The Postmodern Turn (1997) excerpt and text search
 Best, Steven, and Douglas Kellner. The Postmodern Adventure: Science, Technology, and Cultural Studies at the Third Millennium Guilford Press, 2001
 Bielskis, Andrius (2005) Towards a Postmodern Understanding of the Political: From Genealogy to Hermeneutics (Palgrave Macmillan, 2005).
 Brass, Tom, Peasants, Populism and Postmodernism (London: Cass, 2000).
 Butler, Judith (1995) 'Contingent Foundations' in (ed. Nicholson) Feminist Contentions: A Philosophical Exchange. New York: Routledge.
 Callinicos, Alex, Against Postmodernism: A Marxist Critique (Cambridge: Polity, 1999).
 
 Drabble, M. The Oxford Companion to English Literature, 6 ed., article "Postmodernism".
 Farrell, John. "Paranoia and Postmodernism," the epilogue to Paranoia and Modernity: Cervantes to Rousseau (Cornell UP, 2006), 309–327.
 Featherstone, M. (1991) Consumer culture and postmodernism, London; Newbury Park, Calif., Sage Publications.
 Giddens, Anthony (1991) Modernity and Self Identity, Cambridge: Polity Press.
 Gosselin, Paul (2012) Flight From the Absolute: Cynical Observations on the Postmodern West. volume I. Samizdat Flight From the Absolute: Cynical Observations on the Postmodern West. Volume I
 Goulimari, Pelagia (ed.) (2007) Postmodernism. What Moment? Manchester: Manchester University Press
 Grebowicz, Margaret (ed.), Gender After Lyotard. NY: Suny Press, 2007.
 Greer, Robert C. Mapping Postmodernism. IL: Intervarsity Press, 2003.
 Groothuis, Douglas. Truth Decay. Downers Grove, Illinois: InterVarsity Press, 2000.
 Harvey, David (1989) The Condition of Postmodernity: An Enquiry into the Origins of Cultural Change
 Honderich, T., The Oxford Companion to Philosophy, article "Postmodernism".
 Hutcheon, Linda. The Politics of Postmodernism. (2002) online edition
 Jameson, Fredric (1991) Postmodernism, or, the Cultural Logic of Late Capitalism
Jarzombek, Mark (2016). Digital Stockholm Syndrome in the Post-Ontological Age. Minneapolis: University of Minnesota Press.
 Kimball, Roger (2000). Experiments against Reality: the Fate of Culture in the Postmodern Age. Chicago: I.R. Dee. viii, 359 p.
 Kirby, Alan (2009) Digimodernism. New York: Continuum.
 Lash, S. (1990) The sociology of postmodernism London, Routledge.
 Lucy, Niall. (2016) A dictionary of Postmodernism
 Lyotard, Jean-François (1984) The Postmodern Condition: A Report on Knowledge
 Lyotard, Jean-François (1988). The Postmodern Explained: Correspondence 1982–1985. Ed. Julian Pefanis and Morgan Thomas.
 Lyotard, Jean-François (1993), "Scriptures: Diffracted Traces." In: Theory, Culture and Society, Vol. 21(1), 2004.
 Lyotard, Jean-François (1995), "Anamnesis: Of the Visible." In: Theory, Culture and Society, Vol. 21(1), 2004.
 MacIntyre, Alasdair, After Virtue: A Study in Moral Theory (University of Notre Dame Press, 1984, 2nd edn.).
 Magliola, Robert, Derrida on the Mend (Lafayette: Purdue University Press, 1984; 1986; pbk. 2000, ISBN I-55753-205-2).
 Manuel, Peter. "Music as Symbol, Music as Simulacrum: Pre-Modern, Modern, and Postmodern Aesthetics in Subcultural Musics," Popular Music 1/2, 1995, pp. 227–239.
 McHale, Brian (1992), Constructing Postmodernism. NY & London: Routledge.
 McHale, Brian (2007), "What Was Postmodernism?" electronic book review,  
 McHale, Brian (2008), "1966 Nervous Breakdown, or, When Did Postmodernism Begin?" Modern Language Quarterly 69, 3:391–413.
 McHale, Brian, (1987) Postmodernist Fiction. London: Routledge.
 
 Murphy, Nancey, Anglo-American Postmodernity: Philosophical Perspectives on Science, Religion, and Ethics (Westview Press, 1997).
 Natoli, Joseph (1997) A Primer to Postmodernity
 Norris, Christopher (1990) What's Wrong with Postmodernism: Critical Theory and the Ends of Philosophy
 Pangle, Thomas L., The Ennobling of Democracy: The Challenge of the Postmodern Age, Baltimore, The Johns Hopkins University Press, 1991 
 Park, Jin Y., ed., Buddhisms and Deconstructions Lanham: Rowland & Littlefield, 2006, ; .
 Pérez, Rolando. Ed. Agorapoetics: Poetics after Postmodernism. Aurora: The Davies Group, Publishers. 2017. .
 
 Powell, Jim (1998). "Postmodernism For Beginners"
 Sim, Stuart. (1999). "The Routledge critical dictionary of postmodern thought"
 Sokal, Alan and Jean Bricmont (1998) Fashionable Nonsense: Postmodern Intellectuals' Abuse of Science
 Stephen, Hicks (2014). "Explaining Postmodernism: Skepticism and Socialism from Rousseau to Foucault (Expanded Edition)", Ockham's Razor Publishing
 Vattimo, Gianni (1989). The Transparent Society
 Veith Jr., Gene Edward (1994) Postmodern Times: A Christian Guide to Contemporary Thought and Culture
 Windschuttle, Keith (1996) The Killing of History: How Literary Critics and Social Theorists are Murdering Our Past. New York: The Free Press.
 Woods, Tim, Beginning Postmodernism, Manchester: Manchester University Press, 1999, (Reprinted 2002) ( Hardback,  Paperback).

External links

 Discourses of Postmodernism. Multilingual bibliography by Janusz Przychodzen (PDF file)
 Modernity, postmodernism and the tradition of dissent, by Lloyd Spencer (1998)
 Postmodernism and truth by philosopher Daniel Dennett
 Stanford Encyclopedia of Philosophy's entry on postmodernism

 
1880s neologisms
Criticism of rationalism
Metanarratives
Modernism
Philosophical schools and traditions
Theories of aesthetics
Allegations
Cultural trends